The Newport 16 is an American trailerable sailboat that was designed by Bill Lapworth as a daysailer and a pocket cruiser and first built in 1965.

The design is a development of the Columbia 15 open boat and was also sold as the Gloucester 16 and in modified form, as the Neptune 15.

Production
The design was built by Newport Boats, Lockley Newport Boats, Gloucester Yachts and Capital Yachts in the United States, but it is now out of production.

Design
The Newport 16 is a recreational keelboat, built predominantly of fiberglass, with wood trim. It has a fractional sloop masthead sloop rig, a raked stem, a slightly angled transom, a transom-hung rudder controlled by a tiller and a fixed fin keel or swing keel.

The boat is normally fitted with a small  outboard motor for docking and maneuvering.

The design has sleeping accommodation for two adults and two children, with a small double "V"-berth in the bow cabin and two straight settee quarter berths in the main cabin. There are no provisions for a  galley. The head is located under the bow "V"-berth.

Variants
Newport 16 and Lockley Newport 16
This model was produced by Newport Boats, later called Lockley Newport Boats and introduced in 1965.

Neptune 16
This model was produced Capital Yachts by and introduced in 1981. It has a revised "two step" coach house roof shape. The fin keel version carries  of ballast.
Gloucester 16
This model was produced by Gloucester Yachts, introduced in 1986 and produced until 1989, with 1,300 boats completed.

Operational history
In a 2010 review Steve Henkel wrote of the Gloucester 16, "at various times, this boat was built by different companies and given different names. She was called the Newport 16, the Lockley Newport 16, and the Gloucester 16—and maybe additional names as well. Depending on manufacturer of the moment, she was available a swing keel (200-lb. board) or a fixed keel (2' 6" draft), or at times, a choice of either. She has a relatively cockpit and small cabin, with two quarter berths, a small footwell, and storage space forward, with a central notch molded in for a portable toilet. The Neptune ... is so similar in appearance, weight, and dimensions, despite her two-step raised cabintop, as to indicate a virtually identical hull and rig, Best features: Big cockpit and fair-sized sailplan make her a sprightly daysailer. Long waterline and relatively heavy ballast give her good stability. Worst features: The fixed-keel model would be relatively difficult to launch and retrieve on a trailer ...."

Henkel also wrote a review of the Neptune 16, indicating that its "dimensions and appearance are only slightly different from the Gloucester 16/Newport 16's; the cabintop is slightly raised in the Neptune to provide more headroom, but performance can be expected to be about the same. However, the boat came in a choice of swing-keel or fixed-keel underbody ... the swing keel, being deeper with keel down, will probably give better windward performance. Best features: This boat is low cost and easy to trailer (in the swing-keel version). Her extra-shallow draft (on the swing-keel model only) is especially good for ramp launching and retrieving. Her big cockpit is good for daysailing, and the fixed-keel model (though less handy on the launch ramp) is relatively stable. Worst features: Construction was focused on economy (e.g., iron rather than lead ballast), so maintenance on used models must be carried out diligently to prevent disastrous deterioration. Space below is relatively cramped. Raised forward deck makes foredeck footing precarious."

See also
List of sailing boat types

References

External links

Keelboats
1960s sailboat type designs
Sailing yachts
Trailer sailers
Sailboat type designs by Bill Lapworth
Sailboat types built by Newport Boats
Sailboat types built by Lockley Newport Boats
Sailboat types built by Gloucester Yachts
Sailboat types built by Capital Yachts